Penki Pellam ( stubborn wife) is a 1956 Telugu-language drama film, produced by D. B. Narayana and S. Bhavanarayana under the Sahini Art Productions banner and directed by Kamalakara Kameswara Rao. It stars N. T. Rama Rao, Rajasulochana, Sriranjani Jr. with music composed by K. Prasada Rao.

Plot
The film begins with Seeta (Sriranjani. Jr) a wise woman who lives with her younger brother Raju, drunkard father Rangaiah (Nagabhushanam), and sick mother Rattamma (Hemalatha). Once Rangaiah bickers with a person when he unfortunately dies and Rangaiah is sentenced. Knowing it, Rattamma passes away and the children become orphans when their neighbor Papaiah (K.V.S.Sarma) shelters them. But Papaiah's wife Tayaru (Chaya Devi) & her sister Sundaramma (Suryakantham) are shrews who behave rudely towards Seeta. Here Papaiah's son Vasu (Amarnath) loves Seeta when Papaiah denounces her and she silently quits. Being cognizant of it, Vasu argues with his father and he too leaves the house. Meanwhile, Sundaramma moves to her distant relative Rao Saheb Govind Rao's (Relangi) house where Sarabhaiah (Ramana Reddy) a thief, has already settled in the form of a saint. Both of them conjoin and make petty robbers. Years roll by, and Seeta works hard and molds his brother Raju (N. T. Rama Rao) as a well-educated person. Right now, Raju gets a part-time job as a tuition teacher to Saroja (Raja Sulochana), a vainglory pampered daughter of Rao Saheb. Saroja loves and marries Raju. Self-esteemed, Raju does not want to stay in his in-law's house, so, he picks up a job and resides. As Saroja is born with a golden spoon she could not adjust to their middle-class mentality. Moreover, she envies Raju giving more importance to Seeta. Time being, Vasu becomes a Police officer, and Rangaiah is released. At present, Sundaramma reaches Saroja when Raju is in camp. On that night, she steals Saroja's jewelry and handover it over to Sarabhaiah. Seeta notices it, but Sundaramma cleverly throws the blame on her, which Saroja also believes. Grief-stricken, Seeta leaves the house. After return Raju learns about the plight, so, he berates Saroja, when haughty Saroja departs to her father. In that muddle, Raju forgets his office money and goes in search of Seeta which Sundaramma steals too. Parallelly, when Saroja lands at home, Rao Saheb smacks and makes her realize the mistake. Simultaneously, Seeta tries to commit suicide, fortunately, Rangaiah saves her. Raju finds her in an unconscious state when Rangaiah recognizes his children. By the time, they reach home Police take Raju into custody. At that juncture, Seeta comes to consciousness and spots Sundaramma skipping. So, she pounces on her, handovers the money, and rushes to the Police Station when Sundaramma falls on claiming it as her own. At that point, Rao Saheb arrives and brings out the reality of Sundaramma when she affirms that the real culprit is Sarabhaiah. Eventually, Vasu checks in and removes the Sarabhaiah's disguise when he is about to skitter, Rangaiah catches him. There, Seeta recollects him and the family is reunited. At last, Saroja pleads for pardon from Seeta & Raju. Papaiah also repents for his deeds and couples up Seeta with Vasu.

Cast
N. T. Rama Rao as Raju
Rajasulochana as Saroja
Sriranjani Jr. as Seeta
Relangi as Raobahadoor Govinda Rao
Ramana Reddy as Sarabhaiah 
Nagabhushanam as Rangaiah
Peketi Sivaram as A. V. Rao
K.V.S.Sarma as Papaiah 
Amarnath as Vasu
A.V.Subba Rao Jr. as Inspector
Suryakantham as Sundaramma 
Chaya Devi as Tayaru
E. V. Saroja as Dancer 
Hemalatha as Rattamma
Seeta

Soundtrack

Music composed by  K. Prasada Rao. Music released by Audio Company.

References

External links

Indian drama films
Films directed by Kamalakara Kameswara Rao
1950s Telugu-language films
Films scored by K. Prasada Rao
1956 drama films
Indian black-and-white films